The Change Tour is the fourth  concert tour by British girl group Sugababes. It supported their fifth studio album, Change. The tour began with 2 nights in Brentwood on 12 March and 13 March 2008, with the final show on 1 May 2008 in Derby. The 30-date tour is their longest yet. Harvey B-Brown, director of the "Denial" video, directed the tour.

General information 
Although they could "easily sell out arenas," the majority of the shows are in more intimate venues. Amelle Berrabah said of the show that they will "be dancing a bit more" and that "the costumes are brilliant." Overall, there are ten costume changes. Keisha Buchanan stated "This is probably the most we've done on the tour, so it was a bit full on." They use doppelgängers to do much of the dancing and interpreting. Sugababes performed a shortened version of the tour at 2008's V Festival, and the Liverpool Summer Pops.

The band pulled out of a scheduled appearance at Scotland's T in the Park music festival, which angered many Scottish fans. While the band had been widely advertised as a Main Stage act, management for the girls' claimed that they were never booked for the festival. Geoff Ellis, organiser of T, refuted these claims. Just a few days after they pulled out, the band announced a concert with fellow popstars McFly in London on the day they were due to be at T. It was later revealed, by the Daily Record, that the real reason the girls pulled out was fear by tour management that they would not be well received by fans of festival headliners Rage Against the Machine waiting at the Main Stage to see the aforementioned act.

Support acts 
Gabriella Cilmi
Luigi Masi
Van Tramp

Setlist 
 "Hole in the Head" (contains elements of "Don't Stop The Music")
 "Round Round"
 "Never Gonna Dance Again"
 "In the Middle"
 "Ugly"
 "Freak like Me" / "Virgin Sexy"
 "Back Down"
 "Too Lost in You" (Piano version)
 "Don't Let Go (Love)"  (En Vogue cover) 
 "Denial"
 "Change"
 "Mended By You" / "Stronger"
 "3 Spoons of Suga" / "Overload"
 "Red Dress"
 "My Love Is Pink"
Encore
  "Push the Button"
  "About You Now"

Critical response 
The critical reaction to the tour was extremely positive, with reviewers praising their vocals and their first attempt at extravagant costumes. A critique from The Times noted that the use of doppelgängers was applauded, because "no incarnation of Sugababes has been able to execute even relatively simple choreographed routines with flair." The reviewer joked that the band "even did a bit of dancing." The tour was described as "refreshing," inspired by Kylie Minogue's "stylish concerts." The Daily Star stated that "it's only minimal fine-tuning that will soon make this one of the best live shows of 2008 – with faultless singing." The review called their cover of En Vogue's "Don't Let Go (Love)" a breathtaking highlight. It has been called "a slick, polished show" and that "for all the flashy sets and multiple costume changes...it was the harmonies and sheer power of the voices which most impressed." The Express & Star labeled the show "a classy, grown-up affair devoid of tack and at times truly outstanding." The Daily Record went as far as saying that "Keisha, Heidi and Amelle - who have been hailed the most successful UK girl group of the 21st century - belted out 20 tracks and thoroughly earned the title."

Tour dates

References 

2008 concert tours
Sugababes concert tours